Calpella (Pomo: Kalpela, meaning "Mussel bearer") is an unincorporated community and census-designated place (CDP) in Mendocino County, California, United States. It is situated within the Ukiah Valley, at the intersection of U.S. Route 101 and State Route 20. The population was 799 at the 2020 census, up from 679 in 2010. The small town is the site of the Mendocino Redwood Company mill and offices, which controls ten percent of the private land in the county.

History
Col. C.H. Veeder and James Pettus, Veeder's son-in-law, founded the town in 1858. It is named after Kalpela, the chief of the nearby Pomo village of Chomchadila. His name comes from Northern Pomo khál phíila, meaning "carrying mussels down".

For a time, it rivaled Ukiah in importance.

The Calpella post office opened in 1860, closed in 1868, reopened in 1872, was discontinued for a time, and moved in 1920.

Geography
The Russian River flows north-to-south through the center of the community, and the CDP extends eastward to the west shore of Lake Mendocino, a reservoir on the East Fork of the Russian River. U.S. Route 101 passes through the western portion of the CDP, and California State Route 20 forms the CDP's northern edge.

Climate
This region experiences warm (but not hot) and dry summers, with no average monthly temperatures above .  According to the Köppen Climate Classification system, Calpella has a warm-summer Mediterranean climate, abbreviated "Csb" on climate maps.

Demographics

The 2010 United States Census reported that Calpella had a population of 679. The racial makeup of Calpella was 465 (68.5%) White, 3 (0.4%) African American, 25 (3.7%) Native American, 3 (0.4%) Asian, 0 (0.0%) Pacific Islander, 145 (21.4%) from other races, and 38 (5.6%) from two or more races. Hispanic or Latino of any race were 256 persons (37.7%).

The Census reported that 679 people (100% of the population) lived in households, 0 (0%) lived in non-institutionalized group quarters, and 0 (0%) were institutionalized.

There were 253 households, out of which 89 (35.2%) had children under the age of 18 living in them, 121 (47.8%) were opposite-sex married couples living together, 37 (14.6%) had a female householder with no husband present, 19 (7.5%) had a male householder with no wife present.  There were 25 (9.9%) unmarried opposite-sex partnerships, and 3 (1.2%) same-sex married couples or partnerships. 56 households (22.1%) were made up of individuals, and 20 (7.9%) had someone living alone who was 65 years of age or older. The average household size was 2.68.  There were 177 families (70.0% of all households); the average family size was 3.13.

The population was spread out, with 171 people (25.2%) under the age of 18, 74 people (10.9%) aged 18 to 24, 177 people (26.1%) aged 25 to 44, 188 people (27.7%) aged 45 to 64, and 69 people (10.2%) who were 65 years of age or older.  The median age was 36.2 years. For every 100 females, there were 108.9 males.  For every 100 females age 18 and over, there were 95.4 males.

The homeowner vacancy rate was 1.6%; the rental vacancy rate was 4.4%.  329 people (48.5% of the population) lived in owner-occupied housing units and 350 people (51.5%) lived in rental housing units.

Government

See also
 Northwestern Pacific Railroad
 Waldorf School of Mendocino County

Notes and references

Census-designated places in Mendocino County, California
Populated places established in 1858
1858 establishments in California
Census-designated places in California